The men's artistic individual all-around event was part of the gymnastics programme at the 1932 Summer Olympics. It was the eighth appearance of the event, which was established in 1900. The competition was held from Monday, August 8, 1932, to Wednesday, August 10, 1932. Twenty-four gymnasts from five nations competed. Each nation could enter a team of 5 gymnasts; Hungary sent only 4. The event was won by Romeo Neri of Italy, the nation's first victory in the event since 1920 and fourth overall (most among nations at the time). István Pelle of Hungary took silver and Heikki Savolainen of Finland earned bronze; it was the first medal in the event for each nation.

The scores of the top 4 individuals for each nation were summed to give a score for the team event. The individual apparatus events were separate from the all-around, with scores not being carried over between the individual events.

Background

This was the eighth appearance of the men's individual all-around. The first individual all-around competition had been held in 1900, after the 1896 competitions featured only individual apparatus events. A men's individual all-around has been held every Games since 1900.

Three of the top 10 gymnasts from the 1928 Games returned: fourth-place finisher Romeo Neri of Italy and sixth-place finishers Mauri Nyberg-Noroma and Heikki Savolainen, both of Finland. Savolainen had the highest total score at the 1931 World Artistic Gymnastics Championships but was not recognized as World Champion because he had not scored 60% or better in all of the exercises. Neither 1930 World Champion Josip Primozic of Yugoslavia or 1931 World Champion Alois Hudec of Czechoslovakia (who had scored below Savolainen in total but had reached 60% in each exercise) competed in Los Angeles.

Japan made its debut in the event. Italy made its seventh appearance, most among nations, having missed only the 1904 Games in St. Louis.

Competition format

The 1932 competition did not follow the aggregation method introduced in 1924 (roughly following the 1904 format) and used again in 1928. Instead, the apparatus events were completely separate from the individual all-around. In the all-around, each competitor performed a compulsory and an optional exercise on each of 4 apparati: parallel bars, horizontal bar, rings, and pommel horse; the vault featured 2 compulsory and 2 optional exercises for each gymnast. Each exercise received a score from 0 to 30. The score for each apparatus was determined by averaging the scores for the 2 or 4 exercises in that apparatus, so the apparatus score was also from 0 to 30. The individual total was the sum of the 5 apparatus scores, 0 to 150.

Schedule

Results

An obligatory and a voluntary exercise was performed on each of the five different apparatuses: horizontal bar, parallel bars, pommel horse, flying rings (rings), and long horse vaulting (vault) (except that 2 obligatory and 2 voluntary exercises were performed on the vault). The results from the first four were divided by two and the score of the vault competition was added. The results based on total points.

References

External links
 Olympic Report 
 

All-round